Beowulf: An Adaptation is a novel by Julian Glover published in 1987.

Plot summary
Beowulf: An Adaptation is a novel in which the 8th century Beowulf is recreated in modern English with lengthier digressions omitted.

Reception
Dave Langford reviewed Beowulf: An Adaptation for White Dwarf #97, and stated that "it reads very well, especially aloud, and is finely illustrated by Sheila Mackie. Something to spend those Xmas book tokens on."

Reviews
Review by Maureen Porter (1988) in Vector 142

References

1987 novels
Novels based on Beowulf